The Great Swim is a national open water swimming event in the United Kingdom, which has had  over 22,000 participants. The event was started in 2008 with a one-mile Great North Swim in Windermere.  Taking its inspiration from the world's biggest half marathon the Great North Run, Great Swim uses the formula of mass participation events to provide a focus and a challenge for which the individual can train.

After the success of the inaugural Great North Swim on 14 September 2008, which attracted over 2,200 swimmers of all ages and abilities (including five of the six Olympic Open Water Medallists), the series was expanded in 2009 to 4 events.  The Great London Swim took place for the first time on 15 August 2009 in Royal Victoria Dock.  The Great Scottish Swim took place on Saturday 29 August 2009 at Strathclyde Park, followed by the Great North Swim on 12 and 13 September 2009 and finally the Great East Swim on Saturday 26 September in Alton Water.

In 2010 the series was extended to include an event in Salford Quays.  All events that year were televised on Channel 4 with hour shows dedicated to each event with extended coverage of the elite races.  In addition, 500m swims have been added to the program at some venues as well as a 2 mile swim which was called The Great North Swim the Extra Mile when introduced in Windermere. However, 2010 saw the cancellation of both the Great Scottish and Great North Swims due to the presence of blue-green algae at both sites, leaving several thousand swimmers disappointed.

2011, however had 10,000 swimmers sign up to the Great North Swim, held over 3 days and included two mile, one mile and half mile events. The Great Salford Swim was shown live on BBC that year but has since been re-branded as The Great Manchester Swim (although still taking place at the same venue).

After a further cancellation of the Great Scottish Swim in 2012, a new venue, Loch Lomond, has been chosen as the venue for the event for 2013.

The Great Manchester Swim was cancelled from 2017.

Most events feature an elite race for women and another elite race for men, combined with a series of "waves" of other swimmers with up to 200 swimmers in each wave.  The course is GPS calibrated to ensure that the exact distance is covered and each competitor is electronically timed, either with a chip strapped to the ankle, or with chips stuck on the cap issued to each swimmer.

Although not specifically a charity swim, many participants have raised money for a range of charities.  Specific charity partners are nominated for each event (and sometimes are able to provide entries) but no restrictions are in place around fund-raising.

See also
Great Run

External links
Official website
Outdoor Swimming Society (UK)
The Water is Open

Swimming in the United Kingdom
Swimming in England
Loch Lomond
Open water swimming